State Road 38 (NM 38) is a state highway in Taos and Colfax counties in the US state of New Mexico. It traverses the Sangre de Cristo Mountains through portions of Carson National Forest and Moreno Valley. NM 38's western terminus is at NM 522 in Questa, and the  eastern terminus is at US 64 in Eagle Nest. The highway passes through Bobcat Pass, the highest mountain pass in the state.

Major intersections

See also

References

038
Transportation in Colfax County, New Mexico
Transportation in Taos County, New Mexico